Mercy Gakuya is a Kenyan politician. She is a member of Jubilee Party and the member of parliament for Kasarani Constituency.

Life 
Gakuya was born and brought up in Nairobi County. Her family relocated to Muringa and there she had her primary and secondary education at Muringa Primary School and Gitugi Girls Secondary School respectively. She furthered her education at the University of Nairobi where she acquired a bachelor's degree in a Chemistry and Zoology, and a master's degree in Medical Physiology. She also attended Jomo Kenyatta University of Agriculture and Technology, where she acquired a master's degree in Leadership and Governance.

Gakuya was elected as the member of parliament for Nairobi County in 2017. Prior to that, she worked as a lecturer at Kenyatta University. In 2017, she became a member of the Parliamentary Broadcasting & Library committee and the Departmental Committee on Health at the National Assembly.

She is the daughter to the member of parliament for Embakasi North Constituency, James Gakuya.

References

Living people
21st-century Kenyan women politicians
21st-century Kenyan politicians
University of Nairobi alumni
Jubilee Party politicians
Year of birth missing (living people)